Dialytheca is a monotypic genus of flowering plants belonging to the family Menispermaceae. The only species is Dialytheca gossweileri.

Its native range is Western Central Tropical Africa.

References

Menispermaceae
Menispermaceae genera
Monotypic Ranunculales genera